The European Patent Organisation (sometimes abbreviated EPOrg in order to distinguish it from the European Patent Office, one of the two organs of the organisation) is a public international organisation created in 1977 by its contracting states to grant patents in Europe under the European Patent Convention (EPC) of 1973. The European Patent Organisation has its seat at Munich, Germany, and has administrative and financial autonomy. The organisation is independent from the European Union, and has as member states all 27 EU member states along with 12 other European states.

The evolution of the Organisation is inherently linked to that of the European Patent Convention. See European Patent Convention for the history of the European patent system as set up by the European Patent Convention, operated by the European Patent Office, and supervised by the Administrative Council of the European Patent Organisation.

Organs 

The European Patent Organisation has two organs: the European Patent Office, which acts as its executive body, and the Administrative Council, which acts as its supervisory body as well as, to a limited extent, its legislative body. The actual legislative power to revise the European Patent Convention lies with the Contracting States themselves when meeting at a Conference of the Contracting States.

Besides, the Boards of Appeal, which do not form an independent organ of the Organisation but are integrated within the European Patent Office, are assigned the role of an independent judiciary. The European Patent Organisation is in that sense an international organisation "modelled on a modern state order and based on the separation of powers principle".

European Patent Office 

The European Patent Office (EPO) examines European patent applications and grants European patents under the European Patent Convention. Its headquarters are located at Munich, Germany, with a branch in Rijswijk (near The Hague, Netherlands), sub-offices in Berlin, Germany, and Vienna, Austria, and a "liaison bureau" in Brussels, Belgium.

Administrative Council 

The Administrative Council is made up of members of the contracting states and is responsible for overseeing the work of the European Patent Office, ratifying the budget and approving the actions of the President of the Office. The Council also amends the Rules of the EPC and some particular provisions of the Articles of the European Patent Convention.

As of 2019, the Chairman of the Administrative Council is Josef Kratochvíl.

Legal status 
The European Patent Organisation has legal personality, and is represented by the President of the European Patent Office.

Member states, extension state, and validation states 

There are, as of October 2022, 39 Contracting States to the EPC, also called member states of the European Patent Organisation: Albania, Austria, Belgium, Bulgaria, Croatia, Cyprus, Czech Republic, Denmark, Estonia, Finland, France, Germany, Greece, Hungary, Iceland, Ireland, Italy, Latvia, Liechtenstein, Lithuania, Luxembourg, Malta, Monaco, Montenegro, Netherlands, North Macedonia, Norway, Poland, Portugal, Romania, San Marino, Serbia, Slovakia, Slovenia, Spain, Sweden, Switzerland, Turkey, and the United Kingdom (see European Patent Convention article for the dates of entry in force in each country). That is, all EU member states are also members of the European Patent Organisation, and, additionally, Albania, Iceland, Liechtenstein, Monaco, Montenegro, North Macedonia, Norway, San Marino, Serbia, Switzerland, Turkey, and the United Kingdom are also members of the European Patent Organisation. The most recent member state to join the EPC entered was Montenegro which did so on 1 October 2022.

In addition, there is one "extension state" which is not a Contracting State to the EPC but has instead signed an extension agreement under which the protection conferred by European patent applications and patents is extended to the relevant country. This is Bosnia and Herzegovina. Slovenia, Romania, Lithuania, Latvia, Croatia, North Macedonia, Albania, Serbia, and Montenegro were all extension states prior to joining the EPC.

Furthermore, there are so-called "validation states" which are not Contracting States to the EPC but have instead signed validation agreements which act similarly to the extension agreements to extend the protection of European patent applications and European Patents. Morocco, Moldova, Tunisia, and Cambodia became validation states on 1 March 2015, 1 November 2015, 1 December 2017, and 1 March 2018, respectively.

See also 
 Eurasian Patent Organization
 European Union Intellectual Property Office (EUIPO), dealing with trademarks and industrial designs for the European Union
 International Patent Institute (IIB), established in 1947 and integrated into the European Patent Organisation on its creation
 Patent examiner
 Trilateral Patent Offices

Notes

References

External links
 

 
Patent offices
Organisations based in Munich